Hydrops caesurus is a snake of the colubrid family. It is found in Argentina, Brazil, and Paraguay.

References

Hydrops
Snakes of South America
Reptiles of Argentina
Reptiles of Brazil
Reptiles of Paraguay
Reptiles described in 2005